Fiorella Negro (26 May 1938 – 7 November 2019) was an Italian competitive figure skater. She represented Italy at the 1956 Winter Olympics in Cortina d'Ampezzo. She also appeared at three European and three World Championships. Her best result, 7th, came at the 1955 European Championships in Budapest, Hungary.

Competitive highlights

References 

1938 births
2019 deaths
Figure skaters at the 1956 Winter Olympics
Italian female single skaters
Olympic figure skaters of Italy